The Prisoner is a 1920 German silent drama film directed by Carl Heinz Wolff and starring Harry Liedtke, Käthe Dorsch and Reinhold Schünzel.

Cast

References

Bibliography
 Bock, Hans-Michael & Bergfelder, Tim. The Concise CineGraph. Encyclopedia of German Cinema. Berghahn Books, 2009.

External links

1920 films
Films of the Weimar Republic
German silent feature films
Films directed by Hubert Moest
German black-and-white films
German crime drama films
1920 crime drama films
Silent drama films
1920s German films